Gérald Roger Métroz (born 16 May 1962 in Martigny) is a journalist, sports consultant, writer, and columnist.

Early life 
Métroz lost both of his legs in 1964 when he was hit by a train when he was at the train station of his hometown.

Paralympics
Métroz participated in the 1996 Paralympic Games in Atlanta. He played in the Men's Doubles and the Men's Singles. In the doubles he played with Martin Erni and made it to the quarter finals.

Other Work
Métroz is also a public speaker at presentations and conferences and the founder of the company Gérald Métroz Sports Consulting.

Books 
 "Soudain un train", Jacques Briod, Editions Autrement (Paris, 2001), German translation "Ich lass mich nicht behindern", Jacques Briod, Scherz Verlag (2002)
 "La Vie d'en bas", Gerald Metroz, Editions Empiric Vision (Martigny, 2019)

Films 
 Gérald Métroz - Elle est pas belle, la vie? by Jean-François Amiguet (2006)

References

External links 
 
 Gérald Métroz's website

Living people
1962 births
Swiss writers in French
Swiss male tennis players
Wheelchair tennis players
Swiss motivational speakers
Swiss people with disabilities
Swiss amputees
People from Martigny